The Reef may refer to:

Places
 The Reef or The Rand, alternative names for the Witwatersrand, a north-facing scarp in South Africa
 Great Barrier Reef or "The Reef", the planet's largest coral reef

Arts, entertainment, and media
 The Reef (novel), a 1912 novel by Edith Wharton
 The Reef (1999 film), a film adaptation of the novel
 The Reef (2010 film), an Australian film
 The Reef: Stalked, a 2022 sequel
 Shark Bait (2006 film), a 2006 South Korean-American animated film also released as The Reef
 The Reef 2: High Tide, a 2012 sequel